Shahidanwala railway station (Urdu and ) is located in Shahidanwala  village, Lodhran district of Punjab province of the Pakistan.

See also
 List of railway stations in Pakistan
 Pakistan Railways

References

External links

Railway stations in Punjab, Pakistan
Railway stations on Lodhran–Khanewal Branch Line